Rovereto ("wood of sessile oaks"; locally: Roveredo) is a city and comune in Trentino in northern Italy, located in the Vallagarina valley of the Adige River.

History

Rovereto was an ancient fortress town standing at the frontier between the bishopric of Trento – an independent state until 1797 – and the republic of Venice, and later between Austrian Tyrol and Italy. In the Middle Ages it was known by its German toponyms Rofreit and Rovereith. This town started to be populated with inhabitants of the prehistory with traces that were found where today are the oldest ways which belong to the actual main historical centre, around via della Terra. The town has a complexity of plans which are printed in various developments, as if it could have different directions to evolve an ideal, brought towards its completeness in the 15th century, from the model of Siena – the leaf of the crown and the classic Athens reference of the foxil Nautilus. Some of the traces left behind (apart from the prehistoric levels) are concerned with the Roman period and, in modern times, with the disappearance of the Saint Thomas door and the hospital that had its name. Let us retrace the comparison: while Siena has Saint Mary as the actual general hospital of the town in regard of which replace the symbols of the basilica, Saint Thomas of Canterbury was a hospital probably for orphans as the one of Saint Catherine.

The town has therefore different reminiscences: a leaf shape (the blazon image is “The Town of the Oak” and, as a lanceolate leaf forms the antique part of the town, it recalls the lance of the Roman army) which in other regards is completed by a coquille form of plan, with more of archaeological expectations, as a radiant line, that in some aspects, may recall to us again the triangular geometric construction of a pure alignment of elements. Up to the mountains, with a hermitage built on the rocks, San Colombano on its way up there is on the left the castles of the town, which has become a memorial museum of the history of the wars as the First World War was close to these boundaries.

In the 16th and 17th centuries the town had a development of cultural and educational institutions, with a call for building from the architects of Lombardia (Comaschi-builders-stone workers), for a unity of style, which doesn’t lack curious humour: at every corner, of the Renaissance part of the city – faces, masked and frowning, when not regarding with such stern expression to surprise, are merging some visible points. The history of education starts its scholarship with Descartes's idea of a human being, with its cathedra threshold of anatomy and renews its philosophic pedagogy with the priest - philosopher Antonio Rosmini, in the aesthetic tradition of text–art resources. Roads are therefore built in a rational cut: brevity, then clarity and scientific development of the thought. In the 16th century, the expansion of the town permits to continue the construction of small but high buildings and to use the river to structure small canals for water. Therefore the colour industry starts with silk and textile its adventure from the more advanced and widespread Venetian corners.

The 19th century is characterized by the influence of the rediscovery of the romance history, with all the consequences of ratios: a tribunal is placed in the area of the new town, with the main external road in its proximities. In a certain regard, it could be said that it’s the handle of Saint Catherine’s sword on the right side of the Corso where we can find the monastery. Indeed, the road ends up with a piazza and a corner toward the meridian Corso (New Corso – Corso Nuovo) that brings us to the Licei. The organization of the triangular setting is quite easy to collect as a zoning system of areas: we can find a trivium of the oldest part of the town, in its original settlement – but a rational Euclidean square corner in the Modern; an extension of the triangular area that develops and gathers some of the actualized styles of Roman genres (the 19th century and the Post Modern, as Fortunato Depero discovered) at its base on the main road to the Province of Trento. 

The town in the 20th century (the Novecento) was recognized as a Peace Town, for its Courtois origin and because of its colossal bell dedicated to the fallen people of the "Grande Guerra". A University organized around the theme, is actually not only a mere representation of a witness. We might say that the structure of this town has constitutional de-tensive equilibrium, of a pragmatic strategy of the forces it is possible as resistance, far from being a method to reduce conflicts by themselves. A tensive weight, in favour of which, to quote Luciano Anceschi, is placed the torsions of our Baroque rediscovery of the translation ideas that enrich languages, guides the Italian lexicon to be reflective and transparent in its style and town planning. Within this frame some of our most famous physicists studied here as Ivo Modena.

Geography
This city is east of Riva del Garda (at the north-western corner of Lake Garda). Rovereto is the main city of the Vallagarina district.

The town is located at the southern edge of the Italian Alps, near the Dolomites. It is bordered by Monte Cengialto ( above sea level) to the east.

Main sights
The castle, built by the counts of Castelbarco in the 13th–14th centuries, and later enlarged by the Venetians during their rule of Rovereto.
The Italian War museum (Museo Storico Italiano della Guerra) is located inside the castle. The Italian War Museum was founded in 1921 in remembrance of the First World War and in it are preserved arms and documents relating to wars from the 16th to the 20th centuries.
The mighty bell Maria Dolens, one of the largest outside Russia and East Asia, and the second-largest swinging bell in the world after the St. Peter's Bell of the Cologne Cathedral. Maria Dolens ("the grieving Virgin Mary") was built under the inspiration of a local priest, between 1918 and 1925, to commemorate the fallen in all wars, and to this day it sounds for the dead every day. Originally a patriotic rather than pacifist idea, it is today regarded as a shrine to peace.
MART, the Museum of Modern and Contemporary Art of Trento and Rovereto offers temporary exhibitions, and educational activities, and has a remarkable permanent collection.
The Casa d'Arte Futurista Depero, Italy's only museum dedicated to the Futurist movement, containing 3,000 objects. The Casa d'Arte Futurista Depero is one of MART's venues. Closed for many years for extensive refurbishment, it reopened in 2009.

In the area of Lavini di Marco footprints of dinosaurs have been found. The species have been identified as the herbivorous Camptosaurus and carnivorous Dilophosaurus.

Marco also hosts a large landslide which was mentioned by Dante Alighieri in his Divina Commedia: "Qual è quella ruina che nel fianco di qua da Trento l'Adice percosse, o per tremoto o per sostegno manco" (Inferno, canto XII).

Economy

In the past, Rovereto was an important centre for the manufacture of silk fabrics. Currently, wine, rubber, chocolate, glasses and coffee are the town's main businesses.

Rovereto is the birthplace (1941) of Sferoflex eyeglasses, now taken over by Luxottica. Other relevant companies located in Rovereto are Marangoni Pneumatici, Sandoz Industrial Products S.p.A., Cioccolato Cisa, and Metalsistem. Rovereto is also home to Pama S.p.A. machine tool builder.

Transport

Rovereto railway station, opened in 1859, forms part of the Brenner railway, which links Verona with Innsbruck.

People
 Gaspare Antonio Cavalcabò Baroni (1682–1759) Baroque painter
 Girolamo Tartarotti (born 1706), author
 Bianca Laura Saibante (1723–1797), poet 
 Giuseppe Tomaselli (1758–1836), operatic tenor
 Giacomo Gotifredo Ferrari (1763–1842), musician
 Antonio Rosmini-Serbati (1797–1855), priest, philosopher and founder of the Institute of Charity (The Rosminians)
 Gustavo Venturi (1830–1898), a bryologist whose herbarium is now kept at the Museo Tridentino di Scienze Naturali in Trento.
 Riccardo Zandonai (born 1883), composer
 Fortunato Depero (1892–1960), artist
 Fausto Melotti (1901–1986), artist and sculptor
 Carlo Belli (1901–1991), artist and writer
 Ivo Modena (born 1929), physics researcher
 Maria Pia Gardini (1936–2012), entrepreneur and critic of Scientology
 Valerio Fioravanti (born 1958), founder of the terrorist group Nuclei Armati Rivoluzionari
 Paolo Seganti (born 20 May 1965), actor, author

Sport 
 Silvano Bresadola (1906-2002), football player
 Armando Aste (born 1926), influential Italian alpinist of the postwar period
 Marco Martinelli (born 1965), a former volleyball player who earned 155 caps for the Italy men's national volleyball team
 Elena Tonetta (born 1988), archer and 2005 Junior European Champion
 Massimo Parziani (born 1992), Motorcycle racer
 Cesare Benedetti (born 1987), professional cyclist.

Twin towns and sister cities

Rovereto is twinned with:
 Bento Gonçalves, Brazil
 Dolní Dobrouč, Czech Republic
 Forchheim, Germany
 Kufstein, Austria

See also
Vallagarina (district)
List of Podestà of Rovereto

References

External links

Official website

Mart Museum of Modern and Contemporary Art of Trento and Rovereto
Blog OcchioDiRovereto
Massa Critica Rovereto
Italian War Museum in Rovereto
ViaggiaRovereto (Android Application) – Implemented as part of SmartCampus project, the research project founded by  TrentoRise, UNITN, and FBK

 
Cities and towns in Trentino-Alto Adige/Südtirol